He Qiaoyuan (1558-1632) was an official in Fujian during the Ming dynasty, known for arguing in 1630 for the repeal of the 1626 ban on foreign trade, and for being a proponent of the silver trade. As a scholar, he also composed the Fujian Gazetteer, the Mingshan Storehouse, and the Min Shu (in 1619).

References

Ming dynasty politicians
Ming dynasty scholars
1558 births
1632 deaths
People from Jinjiang, Fujian
Politicians from Quanzhou